Jimmy Donley (August 17, 1929 – March 20, 1963) was an American singer-songwriter.

James Kenneth Donley, a native of Gulfport, Mississippi, began his musical career playing in local bars.  He served briefly in the Army before being discharged on psychological grounds, then revived his musical career.

Donley wrote many songs, such as "Born To Be A Loser", that went on to be hits by other artists, including Fats Domino and Jerry Lee Lewis. Some of his songs were credited to Rev. J. Charles Jessup, a preacher to whom Donley sold the rights to his output.

Married six times, and prone to bouts of both heavy drinking and domestic violence, Donley saw his musical career decline in the early 1960s.  At the age of 33, he committed suicide, by asphyxiating himself with his car's exhaust fumes.

At the time of his death, he was married to Lillie Mae Ugas Donley, who has since died. They are laid to rest next to each other in Saucier, Mississippi.

References

External links
 Rockabillyhal.com
 

1929 births
1963 suicides
People from Gulfport, Mississippi
American male singer-songwriters
Swamp pop music
Tear Drop Records artists
Chess Records artists
Charly Records artists
Decca Records artists
Suicides in Mississippi
20th-century American singers
Singer-songwriters from Mississippi
Suicides by asphyxiation
United States Army soldiers
20th-century American male singers